Agas or AGAS may refer to:
 Agăș, a commune in Bacău County, Romania
 Agăș River, Romania
 Antiglobalization activists in Syria
 Amino-acid N-acetyltransferase, an enzyme
 Neoabietadiene synthase, an enzyme
 Ralph Agas (1540–1621), English land surveyor
 Agas operations, Australian reconnaissance commandos operations in Borneo during World War II
 Agha (Ottoman Empire)